Frank Winston Ballance Jr. (February 15, 1942 – February 22, 2019) was an American politician and attorney who was a Democratic member of the United States House of Representatives from 2003 to 2004, representing North Carolina's 1st congressional district.

In 2004, Ballance pleaded guilty to one count of conspiracy to commit mail fraud and money laundering, and was sentenced to four years in prison, two years supervised release, and fined $10,000.

Background
Ballance was born in Windsor, North Carolina. He graduated from W. S. Etheridge High School in 1959 and attended North Carolina Central University, earning a bachelor's degree in 1963 and a law degree in 1965.

After receiving his law degree, Ballance briefly served as a faculty member of the South Carolina State University School of Law before entering private practice in 1966. He served in the North Carolina National Guard Reserve from 1968 to 1971.

Political career
Ballance was first elected to the House of the state legislature in 1983 and served until 1986. In 1988, he was elected to the North Carolina Senate; that same year, he had served as chair of the Guilford County chapter of the NAACP. Ballance served in the state senate until 2002, including as deputy president pro tempore from 1997 to 2002. He was appointed to the Board of Trustees for both North Carolina Central University and Elizabeth City State University.

Ballance ran for and was elected to, the United States House of Representatives from North Carolina's 1st congressional district in 2002. After election to Congress, he served as the president of the 108th Congress's Democratic freshman class. Ballance served on the House Agriculture Committee and the House Small Business Committee.

On June 8, 2004, Ballance resigned from his seat due to health issues after being diagnosed with myasthenia gravis. Ballance's successor, G. K. Butterfield, was elected in a special election on July 20.

Criminal convictions
On September 2, 2004, Ballance was indicted on federal charges including money laundering, mail fraud, and conspiracy to commit mail fraud.  The charges arose after allegations were made that Ballance took $2.3 million in state funds he secured as a State Senator for the John A. Hyman Memorial Youth Foundation and used the cash for the enrichment of himself, his family, and his church.

On November 9, 2004, a plea agreement was reached under which Frank Ballance pleaded guilty to one count of conspiracy to commit mail fraud and money laundering. In January 2005, he was disbarred from the practice of law in the state of North Carolina. On October 12, 2005, he was sentenced to four years in prison, two years supervised release, and fined $10,000. He began serving his sentence at the medium-security federal prison in Butner, North Carolina, on December 30, 2005. According to the Federal Bureau of Prisons, he was released from prison in June 2009.

His son, Garey Ballance, a state district judge in Guilford County, North Carolina, was also charged. Garey Ballance was also charged in the indictment with income tax evasion. Garrey Balance was convicted, served in prison and was disqualified from becoming a judge again.

Personal life and death
Ballance married Bernadine Smallwood in 1969, and together, they had three children. Ballance died on February 22, 2019, from surgical complications at a Raleigh hospital.

See also
List of African-American United States representatives
List of American federal politicians convicted of crimes
List of federal political scandals in the United States

References

External links

Carolina Journal on the Ballance scandal
 

|-

|-

1942 births
2019 deaths
20th-century African-American politicians
African-American men in politics
20th-century American lawyers
20th-century American politicians
21st-century African-American politicians
21st-century American politicians
African-American members of the United States House of Representatives
African-American state legislators in North Carolina
American money launderers
Democratic Party members of the United States House of Representatives from North Carolina
Disbarred American lawyers
Elizabeth City State University trustees
Democratic Party members of the North Carolina House of Representatives
North Carolina Central University alumni
North Carolina lawyers
North Carolina National Guard personnel
North Carolina politicians convicted of crimes
Democratic Party North Carolina state senators
Politicians convicted of mail and wire fraud
Politicians from Winston-Salem, North Carolina
South Carolina State University faculty